SamePage is an enterprise wiki application written in Java with a WYSIWYG user interface. Developed and marketed by eTouch Systems, SamePage is sold as a hosted/Software as a service (SaaS) or on-premises software for collaboration and knowledge management. It is not open-source.

SamePage is a scalable and dynamic wiki that enables its users to collaborate online, share knowledge and company information and communicate in a secure, well-supported online environment.

SamePage is used by medium and large enterprises around the world, including Alcatel-Lucent, NASA, Citrix, Hestia, Teradyne, Siemens, NY State Unified Court System and Loyola Marymount University (LMU).

SamePage is supported in a strategic partnership with Cisco/WebEx and has additional distribution channels via Etelos. In April 2009, it became the first enterprise wiki available on the Force.com AppExchange from salesforce.com.

SamePage features do not include a wiki syntax nor does it provide dynamic topic linking.

On April 26, 2011, eTouch released version 4.4 of SameTouch.

References

External links 
 SamePage website
 A Wiki Wonderland, KM World, September 16, 2009
 eTouch SamePage Publishes Enterprise Wiki Case Study on Cal Poly Pomona, eSchool News, August 19, 2009
 Enterprise Wiki SamePage Now On SalesForce.com AppExchange, TechCrunch IT, April 15, 2009
 Wiki: Silly Name, Useful Technology, Network World, March 12, 2009
 The SaaS Deployment Model Offered in an On Premises Wiki, CMS Wire, Feb 13., 2009
 The Maturation of Enterprise Wikis, KM World, Oct. 8, 2008

Proprietary wiki software